is a female Japanese shōjo manga artist. She comes from Okayama Prefecture.

List of manga                                                   
 (2002)
 (2003)
 (2002–03)
 (2003)
 (2003–04)
 (2004–09)
 (2007)
 (2007)
 (2008)
 (2009–10)
 (2010–12)
 (2013–present)

References

External links
Official blog

1969 births
Kirarin Revolution
Manga artists from Okayama Prefecture
Living people